Adventure  is a gaff rigged knockabout schooner.  She was built in Essex, Massachusetts, USA, and launched in 1926 to work the Grand Banks fishing grounds out of Gloucester. She is one of only two surviving knockabout fishing schooners – ships designed without bowsprits for the safety of her crew.

Adventure was declared a National Historic Landmark in 1994, underwent a substantial restoration in 2012, and sails today in the tourist trade out of Gloucester.

History
Designed by Thomas F. McManus of Boston and built at the John F. James & Son Yard in Essex, Massachusetts, for Captain Jeff Thomas of Gloucester, Adventure was one of the last wooden sailing vessels of her kind built for the dory-fishing industry.

Adventure, named for one of the fantasy fleet of ships drawn by Captain Thomas's young son, is a knockabout schooner, designed without a bowsprit for the safety of the crew. The McManus knockabout design was regarded by maritime historian, Howard I. Chapelle, as "the acme in the long evolution of the New England fishing schooner."  Launched on 16 September 1926, Adventure measured  overall, sported a gaff rig and carried a  diesel engine, and a crew of twenty-seven. She fished the once bountiful Grand Banks of the North Atlantic from her home port of Gloucester from 1926 to 1953 under Captain Jeff Thomas and later, Captain Leo Hynes. Adventure was the biggest money-maker of the time, landing nearly $4 million worth of cod and halibut in her fishing career. Her retirement marked the end of the American dory-fishing schooner in the North Atlantic.

In 1954, Adventure was sold to Donald Hurd, Dayton Newton, and Herbert Beizer and refitted for the windjammer tourist trade, carrying vacationing passengers up and down the Maine coast. The fish pens were converted into cabins and the engine removed to make room for sleeping quarters. Adventures prowess in the Gulf of Maine earned her the nickname "Queen of the Windjammers."

In 1964 she was sold to Captain Jim Sharp of Camden, Maine, who continued her career in the tourist trade for nearly twenty-four years. In 1988, Captain Sharp donated Adventure to the people of Gloucester to be preserved as Gloucester's historic tall ship, to be used to educate the public about the role of fishing in American history.

In 1988, the non-profit group, Gloucester Adventure, Inc., was formed to preserve the schooner as a monument to the history of Gloucester. Through the efforts of the Gloucester Adventure, Inc. and dedicated volunteers, Adventure is now a destination site on the Essex National Heritage Area Maritime Trail, is listed in the National Register of Historic Places and is a designated National Historic Landmark. In 1999, Adventure was selected as an Official Project of Save America's Treasures by the National Trust for Historic Preservation.

Restoration

Restoration work on Adventure was commenced in 2012 at Maritime Gloucester on Harbor Loop. In September 2012 she was fitted with a Detroit Diesel 671 engine and moved under her own mechanical power for the first time since 1954. In August 2013 she left Gloucester Harbor under full sail, and received her Passenger Vessel certificate from the United States Coast Guard in June 2015.

See also
 List of schooners
 National Register of Historic Places listings in Gloucester, Massachusetts
 National Register of Historic Places listings in Essex County, Massachusetts
 List of National Historic Landmarks in Massachusetts

References

External links
 
 
 

National Historic Landmarks in Massachusetts
Individual sailing vessels
Tall ships of the United States
Schooners of the United States
Ships built in Essex, Massachusetts
1926 ships
Ships on the National Register of Historic Places in Massachusetts
Buildings and structures in Gloucester, Massachusetts
National Register of Historic Places in Essex County, Massachusetts